Die Brautwahl (The Bridal Choice) is a "comic-fantastic" opera in three acts and an epilogue by Ferruccio Busoni. The German libretto, by Busoni himself, is based on a short story by E. T. A. Hoffmann. Busoni began work on this, his first completed opera, in 1905.

Die Brautwahl was first performed at the Stadttheater Hamburg on 12 April 1912. It was not a success with audiences but its failure did not discourage the composer's ambition to write for the operatic stage.

Roles

Synopsis
The artist Edmund is in love with Albertine but he has many rivals for her hand. These include the "revenant" Manasse, his son Baron Bensch and the bureaucrat Thusman. The "bridal choice" of the title is finally decided by a trial involving three caskets which Edmund wins.

Recordings
1999: Siegfried Vogel, Carola Höhn, Graham Clark, Vinson Cole, Deutsche Oper Berlin Chorus, Staatskapelle Berlin, conducted by Daniel Barenboim (Teldec)

References

Further reading
Holden, Amanda (ed.), The New Penguin Opera Guide, New York: Penguin Putnam, 2001.

External links

Operas based on works by E. T. A. Hoffmann
Operas by Ferruccio Busoni
German-language operas
Opera world premieres at the Hamburg State Opera
1912 operas
Operas